Ernst A. Hug (b. 23 October 1910 - d. April 1979) was a Swiss ice hockey player who competed for the Swiss national team at the 1936 Winter Olympics in Garmisch-Partenkirchen.

References

External links
Ernst Hug statistics at Sports-Reference.com

1910 births
1979 deaths
Ice hockey players at the 1936 Winter Olympics
Olympic ice hockey players of Switzerland
Swiss ice hockey defencemen